The 2006 Big South Conference men's basketball tournament took place February 28, March 2, 4, 2011, at campus sites. The tournament was won by the Winthrop Eagles, as they defeated Liberty in the quarterfinals 93–52, High Point 77–65 in the semifinal round, and finally Coastal Carolina 51–50 in the championship game.

Format 
The top eight eligible teams can qualify for the Big South tournament. The seeds are judged by conference winning percentage. The winner receives an automatic bid to the NCAA tournament. Winthrop got the bid to the NCAA Tournament, and fell in the first round as the #15 seed to #2 seed Tennessee, 63–61.

Bracket 

 Asterisk indicates overtime game

References

Tournament
Big South Conference men's basketball tournament
Big South Conference men's basketball tournament
Big South Conference men's basketball tournament
Big South Conference men's basketball tournament